The 2000–01 Umaglesi Liga was the twelfth season of top-tier football in Georgia. It began on 19 August 2000 and ended on 23 May 2001. Torpedo Kutaisi were the defending champions.

Locations

First stage

League table

Results

Second stage

Championship group

Table

Results

Relegation group

Table

Results

Relegation play-offs

Top goalscorers

See also 

 2000–01 Georgian Cup

References
Georgia - List of final tables (RSSSF)

Erovnuli Liga seasons
1
Georgia